Giorgio Vanzetta (born 9 October 1959 in Cavalese) is an Italian former cross-country skier who competed from 1980 to 2002. His best known victory was part of the 4 × 10 km relay team that upset Norway at the 1994 Winter Olympics in Lillehammer. He also won three medals at the 1992 Winter Olympics in Albertville with a silver in the 4 × 10 km relay and bronzes in the 10 km + 15 km combined pursuit and 50 km.

Vanzetta also won two silver medals in the 4 × 10 km relay (1985, 1993) at the Nordic skiing World Championships. His sister, Bice, also competed in cross-country skiing from 1986 to 1994.

At the Opening Ceremony for the 2006 Winter Olympics in Turin on 10 February, he and his 4 × 10 km relay teammates (Maurilio De Zolt, Marco Albarello, and Silvio Fauner) who won the gold at the 1994 Winter Olympics in Lillehammer, were among the last carriers of the Olympic torch before it was lit by fellow Italian cross-country skier Stefania Belmondo.

Cross-country skiing results
All results are sourced from the International Ski Federation (FIS).

Olympic Games
 4 medals – (1 gold, 1 silver, 2 bronze)

World Championships
 2 medals – (2 silver)

World Cup

Season standings

Individual podiums

3 podiums

Team podiums
 3 victories
 11 podiums 

Note:  Until the 1999 World Championships and the 1994 Olympics, World Championship and Olympic races were included in the World Cup scoring system.

References

External links
 

1959 births
Living people
Italian male cross-country skiers
Cross-country skiers at the 1980 Winter Olympics
Cross-country skiers at the 1984 Winter Olympics
Cross-country skiers at the 1988 Winter Olympics
Cross-country skiers at the 1992 Winter Olympics
Cross-country skiers at the 1994 Winter Olympics
Olympic medalists in cross-country skiing
People from Cavalese
FIS Nordic World Ski Championships medalists in cross-country skiing
Medalists at the 1992 Winter Olympics
Medalists at the 1994 Winter Olympics
Olympic gold medalists for Italy
Olympic silver medalists for Italy
Olympic bronze medalists for Italy
Olympic cross-country skiers of Italy
Cross-country skiers of Fiamme Gialle
Sportspeople from Trentino